Haftkhan (also Romanized as Haftkhān; also known as Hafkūn and Haft Khvān) is a village in Banesh Rural District, Beyza District, Sepidan County, Fars Province, Iran. At the 2006 census, its population was 462, in 109 families.

References 

Populated places in Beyza County